Charles William Merton (24 November 1918 – 30 August 2000) was an Australian rules footballer who played with Footscray in the Victorian Football League (VFL).	

Merton apparently tied with the winner in the 1938 – Murray Football League O'Dwyer Medal, but strangely has not been officially recognised as a joint winner of the award.	

Merton later served in the Australian Army during World War II.

Notes

External links 
		

1918 births
2000 deaths
Australian rules footballers from Victoria (Australia)
Western Bulldogs players